Saint-Jean-du-Sud is a commune in the Port-Salut Arrondissement, in the Sud department of Haiti. In 2009, it had 23,251 inhabitants.

Settlements

References

Populated places in Sud (department)
Communes of Haiti